= Umuaghadi Inyishia =

Village in Imo state, Nigeria

Umuaghadi Inyishia is a village in southeastern Nigeria. It is located near the city of Owerri.
